Michael Fitzhardinge Berkeley, Baron Berkeley of Knighton,  (born 29 May 1948) is an English composer, broadcaster on music and member of the House of Lords.

Early life
Berkeley is the eldest of the three sons of Elizabeth Freda (née Bernstein) (1923–2016) and the composer Sir Lennox Berkeley. He was educated at The Oratory School, in Woodcote, and Westminster Cathedral Choir School. He was a chorister at Westminster Cathedral, and he frequently sang in works composed or conducted by his godfather, Benjamin Britten. He studied composition, singing and piano at the Royal Academy of Music. He also played in a rock band, Seeds of Discord. In his twenties, when he went to study with Richard Rodney Bennett, he concentrated on composition.

Prizes and posts
In 1977 he was awarded the Guinness Prize for Composition. In 1979, the Scottish Chamber Orchestra appointed Berkeley its associate composer. Berkeley was composer-in-association with the BBC National Orchestra of Wales from 2000 until 2009. He also acted as visiting professor in Composition at the Royal Welsh College of Music & Drama and was artistic director of the Cheltenham Music Festival from 1995 to 2004. In 2002 and 2003 he was international guest curator of chamber music programs at the Sydney Festival, Australia's largest arts festival.

Berkeley was appointed a Commander of the Order of the British Empire (CBE) in the 2012 Birthday Honours for services to music.

Berkeley is a Fellow of the Royal Northern College of Music and an honorary Doctor of Music from the University of East Anglia and a Fellow of the Royal Academy of Music. He is President of the Presteigne Festival of Music and is also a Vice-President of the Joyful Company of Singers.

Membership of the House of Lords
In February 2013, it was announced that he would be made a life peer and enter the House of Lords as a crossbencher and on 26 March 2013 he was created Baron Berkeley of Knighton, of Knighton in the County of Powys.

In 2018 Michael Berkeley successfully instigated and steered through the House of Lords an Amendment to the Children Act 1989. This corrected an oversight in the law that meant that, while the Family Court could issue a Care Order for a child at risk of forced marriage or from a habitually drunk and violent father, it could not issue an Order for a child at risk of Female Genital Mutilation. The bill received unanimous backing in the House of Lords but, on reaching the House of Commons, where it was sponsored by Zac Goldsmith, it was twice objected to by Christopher Chope. This led to national outrage, and several cabinet ministers condemned Chope's actions. Subsequently, first the Home Secretary and then the Prime Minister told parliament that they would find Government time for the Bill, which finally received Royal Assent on 15 March 2019.

Compositions
Berkeley's compositions include an oboe concerto (1977), an oratorio Or Shall We Die? (libretto by Ian McEwan) (1982), Gethsemani Fragment (1990), Twenty-One (1991), an opera Baa Baa Black Sheep (libretto by David Malouf based on the childhood of Rudyard Kipling) (1993). Orchestral works include Secret Garden (1997) and The Garden of Earthly Delights (1998) plus concerti for clarinet, oboe, and 'cello. In 2000, Berkeley wrote his second opera, Jane Eyre (libretto also by David Malouf), which was premiered at the Cheltenham Music Festival by Music Theatre Wales and subsequently toured around the UK. The original drafts for Jane Eyre, representing one year's worth of work and the only copy of them, had been stolen from outside his London home in May 1999. The manuscripts were never recovered, and Berkeley re-composed the opera completely in one year's time, for performance at Cheltenham.

In October 2009, his chamber opera For You, again with Ian McEwan as librettist, was premiered by Music Theatre Wales. A projected opera of McEwan's novel Atonement with libretto by Craig Raine for Dortmund Opera has been shelved.

Berkeley has written a considerable amount of chamber and choral music, including the specially commissioned Listen, listen O my child for the enthronement of Justin Welby as Archbishop of Canterbury in 2013. and the Magna Carta Te Deum, for the 800th anniversary of Magna Carta in 2015.

The score for act 1 of his opera Jane Eyre was stolen, so Berkeley rewrote it but in a more concentrated form, with only five voices and 13 instruments.

Broadcasting
Berkeley is also known as a television and radio broadcaster on music. Between 1974 and 1979 he worked for BBC Radio 3 as a staff continuity announcer. Also on Radio   he contributed to Record Review (1972–77) and was a regular presenter of Mainly for Pleasure (1980–92)  and In Tune (1992–93).

Since 1995 Berkeley has presented BBC Radio 3's Private Passions, in which celebrities are invited to choose and discuss several pieces of music. In December 1997, one of his guests was a 112-year-old Viennese percussionist called Manfred Sturmer, who told anecdotes about Brahms, Clara Schumann, Richard Strauss, Arnold Schoenberg and others so realistically that some listeners did not realise that the whole thing was a hoax perpetrated by Berkeley and John Sessions. On 30 December 2018, the Prince of Wales was the guest on Private Passions, in order to mark the passing of over one thousand editions of the programme, and to celebrate the prince's 70th birthday.

Personal life
Berkeley has been married twice. His first marriage was to the literary agent Deborah Rogers. The marriage lasted from 1979 until her death in April 2014. The couple adopted a daughter, Jessica. Berkeley composed his Violin Concerto (in memoriam D.R.), premiered in July 2016 at The Proms, in tribute to Rogers. In June 2016, Berkeley married Elizabeth West. Berkeley has a residence in London and a farm in Wales.

See also
Berkeley Ensemble

References

External links 
 
 Michael Berkeley's webpage on his publisher's website, Oxford University Press
 Reviews of Music Theatre Wales's production of Jane Eyre
 Transcript of interview on Australian Broadcasting Company's Sunday Morning, January 2002
 Transcript of interview on Australian Broadcasting Company's The Music Show regarding Jane Eyre, May 2005
 Rogers, Coleridge & White literary agency biography on Michael Berkeley

1948 births
20th-century classical composers
20th-century English composers
20th-century British male musicians
20th-century British musicians
21st-century British male musicians
21st-century classical composers
Alumni of the Royal Academy of Music
BBC Radio 3 presenters
Commanders of the Order of the British Empire
English classical composers
English opera composers
Male opera composers
Crossbench life peers
Living people
Musicians who were peers
People educated at The Oratory School
English male classical composers
People's peers
Life peers created by Elizabeth II